Clemens Zwijenberg (born 18 May 1970) is a Dutch former professional footballer who played as a defender. He is best known for playing 148 games with FC Twente in the 1980s and 1990s.

Career
Born in Enschede, Zwijnenberg started his senior career with Twente. In 1998, he signed for Aalborg Boldspilklub in the Danish Superliga, where he made nine league appearances and scored one goal. After that, he played for English club Bristol City, Dutch club NAC Breda, and Austrian club Austria Lustenau before retiring in 2001.

References

External links 
 7. december: Det nordjyske millionflop 
 CLEMENS ZWIJNENBERG 
 Sporløs med Clemens Zwijnenberg 
 Vluchtoord voor vergeten voetballers 
 Niew Voetbalblad 
 Oud-back heeft weinig empathie met noodlijdend FC Twente 
 Clemens Zwijnenberg: 'Nacompetitie is kleine frustratie hier' 
 Clemens Zwijnenberg: “Het leuke voetballeventje houdt een keer op” 
 De Volkskrant Tag 
 Ajax blij met doelpunt Zwijnenberg 
 tubantia.nl Tag 
 Ajax-trainer Erik ten Hag, een man met een plan 
 Utrecht zoekt versterking in Zwijnenberg en Lawson 
 Clemens Zwijnenberg nieuwe hoofdtrainer DSVD 
 Kentudezenog Profile 
 
 
 Bundesliga.at Profile

Living people
1970 births
Dutch footballers
Association football defenders
Eredivisie players
Danish Superliga players
English Football League players
Austrian Football Bundesliga players
FC Twente players
Feyenoord players
AaB Fodbold players
Bristol City F.C. players
NAC Breda players
SC Austria Lustenau players
Dutch expatriate footballers
Dutch expatriate sportspeople in Denmark
Expatriate men's footballers in Denmark
Dutch expatriate sportspeople in England
Expatriate footballers in England
Dutch expatriate sportspeople in Austria
Expatriate footballers in Austria